Crockerhill may refer to:
 Crockerhill, Hampshire
 Crockerhill, West Sussex